Maite Alberdi Soto (Santiago, Chile, March 29, 1983) is a Chilean film producer, director, documentarian, screenwriter, and film critic. Her most recent film The Mole Agent (2020) was an Academy Awards nominee for Best Documentary and a contender for Best International Feature. The film is also a nominee at the Goya Awards for Best Iberoamerican Film. Maite is the founder of Micromundo Producciones.

Career 
She is the Audiovisual Director of the Pontificial Catholic University of Chile, and teaches documentary directing at several universities. Her works as a film critic have been published on the site La Fuga, a film studies magazine founded in 2005 in Santiago, Chile, with the objective to "open a field of debate and academic reflection, producing and disseminating unpublished material of interest for the cinematographic cultural field." She co-authored a book titled Teorías del cine documental en Chile: 1957-1973.  She was invited as a member of the Academy of Motion Pictures Arts and Sciences in June 2018, under the documentary branch. Her most recent work is the long feature the Mole Agent. She was also acting producer for Los Reyes, following the lives of two stray dogs as "they wander around the oldest skatepark (Los Reyes) in the Chilean capital of Santiago."

Style and themes 
As a director, Maite Alberdi takes interest in the intimate portrayal of the characters, often working with them over multiple years and curating a lasting relationship. Her style has been achieved through everyday storytelling in small-scale worlds, while also focusing great attention to normalize characters, highlighting different issues relating to disability, marginalization, often observing moments that are usually made private.

Education 
Maite Alberdi has a degree in Aesthetics and a degree in Social Communication from the Pontificial Catholic University of Chile.

Filmography 
Since 2004, Maite Alberdi has participated in taking on various roles in the making of each of these films. Films with their original Spanish titles are followed by their English translation, or English-provided title in parenthesis.

 The Eternal Memory (2023)
The Mole Agent (2020)
Los Reyes (The Kings) (2018)
Los niños (The Grown-Ups) (2016)
Yo no soy de aquí (I'm Not From Here) (short film, 2016)
Vida sexual de las plantas (The Sexual Life of Plants) (2015)
Propaganda (2014)
La once (Tea Time) (2014)
Verano (Summer) (2011)
El salvavidas (The Lifeguard) (2011)
Las peluqueras (The Hairdressers) (short film, 2008)
Los trapecistas (The Trapeze Artists) (short film, 2005)
Carrete Down (Reel Down) (short film, 2004)

Awards and nominations

References

External links

Voces Cine Panel "Chilean cinema, industry and internationalization"
The Grown Ups interview: moving documentary casts Down's syndrome in a new light
_Cat & Docs Boards ‘Los Reyes’
"Cinélatino" La once/ Tea Time
“El Salvavidas” de Maite Alberdi: Lejos de Baywatch, cerca del Tabo

1983 births
Living people
Chilean film directors
Chilean women film directors
People from Santiago